Noah Michel (born 23 May 1995) is a German footballer who plays as a forward for Türk Gücü Friedberg.

Career
Michel made his professional debut for Jahn Regensburg in the 3. Liga on 24 September 2014, coming on as a substitute in the 81st minute for Benedikt Schmid in the 0–2 home loss against Holstein Kiel.

References

External links
 Profile at DFB.de
 Profile at kicker.de
 Profile at Fussball.de
 2015–16 statistics
 2016–17 statistics
 2017–18 statistics

1995 births
Living people
People from Lich, Germany
Sportspeople from Giessen (region)
Footballers from Hesse
German footballers
Association football forwards
SSV Jahn Regensburg players
FC Gießen players
3. Liga players
SSV Jahn Regensburg II players
21st-century German people